Arthur Chaskalson SCOB, (24 November 1931 – 1 December 2012) was President of the Constitutional Court of South Africa from 1994 to 2001 and Chief Justice of South Africa from 2001 to 2005. Chaskalson was a member of the defence team in the Rivonia Trial of 1963.

Career
Born in Johannesburg, Chaskalson was educated at Hilton College and later graduated from the University of the Witwatersrand with a BCom (1952) and LLB Cum Laude (1954).

In 1963, Chaskalson, along with Bram Fischer, Joel Joffe, Harry Schwarz, George Bizos, Vernon Berrangé and Harold Hanson, was part of the former President Nelson Mandela's defence team in the Rivonia Trial, which saw Mandela sentenced to life imprisonment.

Chaskalson left a very successful legal practice to become a human rights lawyer, helping to establish the Legal Resources Centre, a non-profit organisation modeled after the NAACP Legal Defense and Educational Fund in the United States seeking to use the law to pursue justice and human rights around South Africa. Chaskalson served as the centre's director from November 1978 until September 1993. In 1975 and 1983, he was leading counsel in the cases of Veli Komani and Mehlolo Tom Rikhotso, which successfully challenged the legality of apartheid legislation seeking to establish influx control, crippling the government's ability to enforce influx control laws.

As the first president of South Africa's new Constitutional Court in 1994, and then later Chief Justice of the same court (following a Constitutional amendment act in 2001 which changed his title), Chaskalson gained a reputation as one of South Africa's leading jurists in constitutional and human rights issues. Chaskalson was a member of the technical committee on constitutional issues appointed by the multi-party negotiating forum in May 1993, acting as a key advisor on the adoption of the Interim Constitution of South Africa in 1993, and was regarded as one of the prime movers of a changing judiciary in South Africa during his time on the bench of the Constitutional Court. The court's first major decision under Chaskalson's leadership was the abolition of the death penalty on 6 June 1995.

More recently, Chaskalson had also become prominent internationally, becoming commissioner of the International Commission of Jurists in 1995 before being selected as one of South Africa's four members on the United Nations Permanent Court of Arbitration in 1999. In 1989, he consulted on the writing of the Constitution of Namibia. He became the President of the International Commission of Jurists then from 2002 until 2008.

On 31 May 2005, Chaskalson retired as Chief Justice and was replaced by his former deputy Pius Langa. In his 2005 State of the Nation speech shortly before Chaskalson's retirement, South African President Thabo Mbeki praised the Chief Justice as a "great son of our people" and a "giant among the architects of our democracy". Mbeki paid tribute to Chaskalson for everything he had done "as a South African, a lawyer and a judge, to shepherd us towards the construction of a South Africa that truly belongs to all who live in it".

He died in Johannesburg on 1 December 2012 from leukemia and was buried in Westpark Cemetery.

Personal life
Chaskalson was survived by his wife Lorraine, with whom he had two sons and five grandchildren. Chaskalson was Jewish and was associated with Progressive synagogues in Johannesburg.

Honours and awards
In 2002 he was awarded the Order of the Baobab (Gold) for "exceptional service in law, constitutional jurisprudence and human rights".

See also

Constitutional Court of South Africa
Constitution of South Africa

References

1931 births
2012 deaths
Chief justices of South Africa
South African Jews
Jewish South African anti-apartheid activists
Judges of the Constitutional Court of South Africa
20th-century South African judges
Members of the Permanent Court of Arbitration
White South African anti-apartheid activists
Burials at Westpark Cemetery
People from Johannesburg
University of the Witwatersrand alumni
South African judges of international courts and tribunals
Alumni of Hilton College (South Africa)
Deaths from leukemia
Deaths from cancer in South Africa
21st-century South African judges
Order of the Baobab